WASP-14 or BD+22 2716 is a star in the constellation Boötes. The SuperWASP project has observed and classified this star as a variable star, perhaps due to the eclipsing planet.

Planetary system
WASP-14b is an extrasolar planet discovered in 2008. This is one of the densest exoplanets known.
Its radius best fits the model of Fortney.

See also
 SuperWASP
 List of extrasolar planets

References

External links
 Image WASP-14
 

Boötes
F-type main-sequence stars
Planetary transit variables
Planetary systems with one confirmed planet
J14330635+2153409
14
Durchmusterung objects